The Foundling is a Regency romance novel written by Georgette Heyer.

Plot summary
The Duke of Sale is tired of being the Duke of Sale.  He just wants to be a nobody from "Nowhere in Particular".  A posthumous child, he has lived since birth with his uncle, Lord Lionel.  Lord Lionel and his team of servants continue to baby the Duke and treat him like a child, even now that he is almost twenty-five years old.  The Duke does not want to be forced into marriage or be told what to do.  He considers setting out on a wild adventure to find out who he really is.

The Duke's cousin Gideon encourages him to set out on the adventure and to avoid his posse of servants.  A bit later, he 
finds out his other cousin Matthew is in a bit of a fix.  Matthew supposedly sent letters to a very beautiful foundling named Belinda, and promised to marry her.  When he decided not to marry her after all, her "guardian", Mr. Leversedge, blackmailed Matthew by letter.  The Duke decides to rescue Matthew for his adventure.

The Duke pretends to be Matthew and goes to deal with the guardian at a low thieves den called the Bird in Hand.  While driving a gig en route, he sees a hurt teenage boy stumbling down the road.  The boy, Tom, becomes a friend and nuisance to the Duke for the rest of the novel.  The Duke successfully deals with the guardian, only to be surprised when Belinda follows him to beg his protection and aid to find a new home.  Soon the Duke gets kidnapped. He cleverly escapes, then has to figure out how to get Tom and Belinda safely home and out of trouble.  He also has his own problems to worry about, including his fight with Lord Lionel and his impending marriage with Lady Harriet.

In the end, the Duke accepts his marriage to Harriet, discovering that he truly does love her.  Belinda, the naïve foundling, only cares about a diamond ring and purple dress, and also finds her true love with the Duke's and Lady Harriet's aid.

References

Novels by Georgette Heyer
Historical novels
1948 British novels
Heinemann (publisher) books
Regency romance novels